Ikari Dam is a gravity dam located in Tochigi prefecture in Japan. The dam is used for flood control and power production. The catchment area of the dam is 271.2 km2. The dam impounds about 310  ha of land when full and can store 55000 thousand cubic meters of water. The construction of the dam was started on 1941 and completed in 1956.

References

Dams in Tochigi Prefecture
1956 establishments in Japan